Yoshitatsu may refer to:
Yoshi Tatsu/Yoshitatsu, the ring names of professional wrestler Naofumi Yamamoto
Yoshitatsu Kiryu, a fictional dollmaker